Dmitry Sergeyevich Shepel; born 8 August 1977) is a retired Russian speedskater.

He became the World Junior Champion in 1998 in Roseville, Minnesota. The same year he set a junior world record on the 1,500 meters, skating that distance in 1:50,45 in Calgary. Shepel had his major success in 2001, when on the high-altitude ice rink of Baselga di Pinè in Italy he became European champion, breaking the hegemony of skaters from the Netherlands who otherwise won every event from 1992 to 2005. 
He participated at the Olympic Winter Games in 1998, 2002 and 2006. His most successful efforts were in 2002 in Salt Lake City, with a 4th place at the 5,000 meters and a 6th place at the 10,000 meters. After this last distance on March 22, 2002, Shepel reached third place in the adelskalender, a ranking based on skaters' all-time personal records for the classic samalog distances, which position he held until January 2005.

Personal records 
 

Source: sskating.com

References

External links
Dmitry Shepel at SpeedSkatingStats.com

1977 births
Living people
Russian male speed skaters
Olympic speed skaters of Russia
Speed skaters at the 1998 Winter Olympics
Speed skaters at the 2002 Winter Olympics
Speed skaters at the 2006 Winter Olympics
Sportspeople from Saint Petersburg
World Allround Speed Skating Championships medalists